Víctor Emilio Luna (born 27 October 1959) is a Colombian footballer. He played in 21 matches for the Colombia national football team from 1983 to 1985. He was also part of Colombia's squad for the 1983 Copa América tournament.

References

External links
 

1959 births
Living people
Colombian footballers
Colombia international footballers
Place of birth missing (living people)
Association football defenders
Footballers from Medellín
Atlético Nacional footballers
América de Cali footballers
Colombian football managers
Independiente Medellín managers
Barcelona S.C. managers
Once Caldas footballers
C.S.D. Macará managers
Atlético Bucaramanga managers
Colombian expatriate football managers
Expatriate football managers in Ecuador